The 2015 Cork Intermediate Hurling Championship was the 106th staging of the Cork Intermediate Hurling Championship since its establishment by the Cork County Board in 1909. The draw for the opening round fixture took place on 14 December 2014. The championship began on 16 May 2015 and ended on 24 October 2015.

On 24 October 2015, Charleville won the championship following a 5-24 to 1-10 defeat of Dripsey in the final at Páirc Uí Rinn. This was their fourth championship title overall and their first title since 1947.

Dripsey's Diarmuid O'Riordan was the championship's top scorer with 2-41.

Team changes

To Championship

Promoted from the Cork Junior Hurling Championship
 Castlemartyr

Relegated from the Cork Premier Intermediate Hurling Championship
 Kilbrittain

From Championship

Promoted to the Cork Premier Intermediate Hurling Championship
 Fermoy

Relegated to the East Cork Junior A Hurling Championship
 St. Catherine's

Results

First round

Second round

Third round

Relegation playoff

Fourth round

 Charleville and Kilbrittain received byes in this round.

Quarter-finals

Semi-finals

Final

Championship statistics

Top scorers

Overall

In a single game

References

External links
 2015 Cork IHC results 

Cork Intermediate Hurling Championship
Cork Intermediate Hurling Championship